LIAZ 200 series trucks were manufactured in Czech company LIAZ. It is only modernisation of LIAZ 100 series and appearance is almost the same as its predecessor. Truck was changed mainly on the technical side, there were changes to the engine (mounting) and cab (larger windscreen etc.), for example. Its soundproofed and storage, newer trucks had a new gearbox. Produced from 1991 to 1996, was made a 484 pieces. The 200 series was followed by the 300 series.

The LIAZ 200 was exported to Indonesia to be used in the local armed forces. 

Trucks made by LIAZ
Trucks of the Czech Republic